Jiang'an District forms part of the urban core of and is one of 13 urban districts of the prefecture-level city of Wuhan, the capital of Hubei Province, China.

Jiang'an District is located on the Yangtze's left (northwestern) shore, and includes the northeastern half of the former Hankou city (northeast, i.e. downstream, of Jianghan Rd.). On the left bank of the Yangtze, it borders Huangpi to the north, Jianghan to the southwest, and Dongxihu to the west; on the opposite bank it borders Hongshan, Wuchang, and Qingshan.

History
The Congressional-Executive Commission on China included Jiang Yanchun, a 46 year old native of Huarong District, Ezhou, in their Political Prisoner Database from November 5, 2017. Jiang was a petitioner who was contesting demolition and resettlement in Jiang'an District when she was detained in Beijing at around 4 PM on Sunday, November 13, 2016 for disrupting order in the Tian'anmen area.  She was returned to Wuhan on November 14, 2016 where she was detained for ten days and then detained again for most of December for "picking quarrels and provoking trouble", which was seen as an arbitrary detention. She was released on bail on December 29, 2016.

Geography

Administrative divisions
Jiang'an District administers:

References

External links
 Jiang'an District official site

Geography of Wuhan
County-level divisions of Hubei